Diane Wald is an American poet and novelist. Her most recent poetry collection is The Warhol Pillows. She has published poems in literary journals and magazines including The American Poetry Review, Skanky Possum, Fence, The Hat, Verse, and The Paterson Review. She was born in Paterson, New Jersey. She earned a B.A. from Montclair State College and an M.F.A. from the University of Massachusetts Amherst, and has lived in Massachusetts since 1972.  She lives near Boston.

Honors and awards
 2020 International Book Awards Winner in Fiction: Novella 
2020 Independent Press Award Winner in Paranormal Romance  
2019 Readers' Favorite Awards Bronze Medal Winner in Fiction (Visionary) 
Winner for Gillyflower in Novella category, Next Generation Indie Book Awards
Winner for Gillyflower in fiction (Novella), Best Book Awards
2021 NYC Big Book Awards Winner in Visionary Fiction for My Famous Brain 
2021 Winner in Visionary Fiction, new Adult Fiction, and Speculative Fiction from Firebirds Book Awards for My Famous Brain 
 Anne Halley Poetry Prize
 Fine Arts Work Center fellowship
 Denny Award
 Open Voice Award
 Massachusetts Artist Grant
 Green Lake Chapbook Award from Owl Creek Press

Published works

Full-length poetry collections

 The Warhol Pillows , 2021, Finishing Line Press, https://www.finishinglinepress.com/product/the-warhol-pillows-by-diane-wald/
 Wonderbender, 2011, 1913 Press, http://www.journal1913.org/publications/wonderbender/
 
 Lucid Suitcase' (Red Hen Press, 1999)

Chapbooks
 Faustinetta, Gegenschein, Trapunto (Cervena Barva Press, 2008)
 Improvisations on Titles of Works by Jean Dubuffet (Mudlark, 1998)
 Double Mirror (Runaway Spoon Press, 1996)
 My Hat That Was Dreaming (White Fields Press)

Novella
 Gillyflower (2019, She Writes Press)

Novel 
https://www.gillyflowernivel.com
 2021: My Famous Brain'' (She Writes Press) https://www.myfamousbrain.com

References

External links
 Www.myfamousbrain.com
 https://www.finishinglinepress.com/product/the-warhol-pillows-by-diane-wald/
http://www.gillyflowernovel.com
 Interview: Cerna Brava Poetry Press > Interview with Diane Wald
 Fence > Vol. 7, No. 2. Fall/Winter 2004 - 2005 > Carolina Wren by Diane Wald

Living people
Poets from New Jersey
Montclair State University alumni
Writers from Paterson, New Jersey
Writers from Massachusetts
University of Massachusetts Amherst MFA Program for Poets & Writers alumni
American women poets
Year of birth missing (living people)
21st-century American women